Pennsylvania elected its members October 12, 1824.

See also 
 1824 Pennsylvania's 8th congressional district special election
 1824 Pennsylvania's 13th congressional district special election
 1825 Pennsylvania's 16th congressional district special election
 1824 and 1825 United States House of Representatives elections
 List of United States representatives from Pennsylvania

References 

1824
Pennsylvania
United States House of Representatives